Michael Schwarz may refer to:

Entertainment
Michael Schwarz (drummer) in Atrocity (band)
Michael Schwarz (filmmaker) on Muhammad: Legacy of a Prophet

Others
Michael Schwarz (professor), Israeli university professor and recipient of a 2011 Israel Prize
Michael Schwarz, political candidate for High Peak (UK Parliament constituency)
Lance Corporal Michael A. Schwarz, see List of acts of the 111th United States Congress
Michael A. Schwarz, economist

See also
Michael Schwartz (disambiguation)